The 1983 World Championship Tennis Finals was a men's tennis tournament played on indoor carpet courts. It was the 13th edition of the WCT Finals and was part of the 1983 World Championship Tennis circuit. It was played at the Reunion Arena in Dallas, Texas in the United States and was held from April 26 through May 1, 1983. Second-seeded John McEnroe won the title, his third at the tournament, and the accompanying $150,000 first-prize money after defeating defending champion Ivan Lendl in a five-set final that lasted 4 hours and 16 minutes.

Final

Singles

 John McEnroe defeated  Ivan Lendl 6–2, 4–6, 6–3, 6–7(5–7), 7–6(7–0)
 It was McEnroe's 2nd singles title of the year and the 41st of his career.

References

External links
 ITF tournament edition details

 
World Championship Tennis Finals
WCT Finals